Felim Egan (8 November 1952 – 19 November 2020) was an Irish painter.

Biography
Born in County Donegal, Egan attended St. Columb's College in Derry before studying Art in Belfast and Portsmouth and at the Slade School of Art in London. He lived and worked in Sandymount, Dublin, Ireland. He painted restrained abstracts in which ghostly squares appear to float to the edge of a monochromatic canvas. The ethereal quality of his paintings owes itself in part to his technique of building up colour by applying layer after layer of thin acrylic mixed with powdered stone.

He represented Ireland at the Paris Biennale in 1980 and the São Paulo Art Biennial in 1985. In 1993 he won the Premier UNESCO Prize for the Arts in Paris, and he received the Gold Award at Cagnes-sur-Mer in 1997. Felim Egan was a member of Aosdána. Major exhibitions of his work were held at the Whitworth Art Gallery, Manchester and the Irish Museum of Modern Art, Dublin in 1995–96, and at the Stedelijk Museum Amsterdam in 1999.

Works in collections
 Fritz-Winter-Haus, Moderne Kunst Museum, Ahlen, Germany
 Ulster Museum, Belfast
 The Arts Council of Ireland
 The Arts Council of Northern Ireland
 Hugh Lane Gallery, Dublin
 University College, Dublin
 Office of Public Works, Dublin.
 Irish Museum of Modern Art, Dublin
 City Art Gallery, Edinburgh
 Trinity College, Dublin
 National Gallery of Ireland
 Metropolitan Museum of Art, New York, N.Y.
 Stedelijk Museum, Amsterdam

External links
 Official website
 Felim Egan at Aosdána

1952 births
Aosdána members
20th-century Irish painters
21st-century Irish painters
Irish male painters
Living people
People from County Donegal
Irish contemporary artists
20th-century Irish male artists